Paul Thieme (18 March 1905 – 24 April 2001) was a German indologist and scholar of Vedic Sanskrit. In 1988 he was awarded the Kyoto Prize in Arts and Philosophy for "he added immensely to our knowledge of Vedic and other classical Indian literature and provided a solid foundation to the study of the history of Indian thought".

Biography
He received his doctorate in Indology in 1928 from the University of Göttingen, and habilitated there in 1932. From 1932 to 1935 he taught German and French at the University of Allahabad. He taught at Breslau from 1936 to 1940, and received tenure at Halle in 1941, but in the same year he was drafted to the German army, where he worked as an interpreter. In 1945, he was captured by U.S. troops in Württemberg. After his release in 1946, he returned to Halle, where he remained until 1953, when he moved to Frankfurt for a professorship in Indo-European studies, against the will of the GDR authorities. From 1954 to 1960 he was in Yale, and from 1960 to his retirement in 1972 in Tübingen as professor for Religious studies and Indology.

Work
Thieme is considered one of the "last great Indologists", advancing all aspects of the philology of Sanskrit, with expertise reaching from the Vedas to the Epics and the Upanishads, Sanskrit poetry and traditional Hindu science (shastra), and Indian grammarians (Panini and his commentators). Thieme was also a comparative linguist, studying Iranian and Indo-European languages in general. Thieme was fluent in Sanskrit, and therefore respected among traditional Indian scholars, holding the inauguration speech at the first World Sanskrit Conference in Delhi in 1971–1972.

Selected bibliography
1929: Das Plusquamperfektum im Veda (Diss. Göttingen 1928).
1935: Panini and the Veda. Studies in the Early History of Linguistic Science in India. Allahabad
1938: Der Fremdling im Rigveda. Eine Studie über die Bedeutung der Worte ari, arya, aryaman und aarya, Leipzig.

References

External links

Paul Thieme at the Martin-Luther University Halle-Wittenberg

Scientists from Berlin
1905 births
2001 deaths
Academic staff of the University of Breslau
Academic staff of Goethe University Frankfurt
Kyoto laureates in Arts and Philosophy
Yale University faculty
Indo-Europeanists
Linguists of Indo-European languages
Academic staff of the University of Tübingen
Members of the Bavarian Academy of Sciences
German Indologists
Linguists from Germany
German male non-fiction writers
Members of the Société Asiatique
20th-century linguists